Women's script or women's writing may refer to:

 Hiragana, a Japanese syllabary sometimes called , 'women's writing'
 The Korean alphabet, sometimes pejoratively called amgeul or amkeul, 'women's script'
 Vaybertaytsh ('women's taytsh&apos;) or vaybershrift ('women's writing'), a semi-cursive script typeface for the Yiddish alphabet

See also
Women's writing (disambiguation)